is a Team handball player from Uki in Kumamoto Prefecture, Japan. She plays for Japan Handball League side Omron. She is a sister of Japan National Team International and JEF United Ichihara Chiba star, Seiichiro Maki and Nagoya Grampus forward/defender Yuki Maki. She is 169 cm tall and weighs 69 kg. Karina Maki's position is utility (often play as offensive defender). During her childhood school days she used to play Ice Hockey (with her brother Seiichiro Maki) and Basketball.  Her nickname is "Hiro" by her teammates and OMRON fans.

Playing style
Karina Maki is well known for her all round skills especially her offensive plays and skills

External links
https://web.archive.org/web/20070825090546/http://omronhbc.web.infoseek.co.jp/ (Japanese) profile of Karina Maki
https://web.archive.org/web/20070825090546/http://omronhbc.web.infoseek.co.jp/ OMRON Handball Team Official Website (Japanese)

1982 births
Living people
Japanese female handball players
Asian Games medalists in handball
Handball players at the 2010 Asian Games
Asian Games silver medalists for Japan
Medalists at the 2010 Asian Games